Lumparn (fi. Lumpari) is a large bay devoid of islands in the main island of Åland, Finland, bordered by Sund to the north, Lumparland to the east, Lemland to the south and Jomala to the west.

Description 
Most of the bay fills a nine kilometer wide impact crater. The crater is estimated to be about 1000 million years old (Proterozoic). The depression was originally believed to be a rift. Extraterrestrial origin was first proposed in 1979, but not until 1993 was the impact structure finally confirmed. Long shatter cones have been discovered in the southwestern part of the bay. The crater is filled with sediments, between Pleistocene sediments and crushed rapakivi granite bedrock there is a layer of Paleozoic (Ordovician) limestones. This makes Lumparn one of the few places in Finland where fossils have been found.

The bay has also previously been referred to as Lumpari in some Finnish documents, though the Research Institute for the Languages of Finland does not list Lumpari as in current usage.

Gallery

See also 
 Impact craters in Finland

References

External links 
 Lumparn impact structure (archived link)
  The Landforms of Finland
 
 Map of Lumparn

Impact craters of Finland
Proterozoic impact craters
Mesoproterozoic Europe
Landforms of Åland